Paul Gobara (born 26 March 2000) is an Austrian professional footballer who plays as a defender for 2. Liga club SV Horn on loan from Rapid Wien.

Club career
Gobara made his professional debut with Rapid Wien in a 1–0 Austrian Bundesliga loss to TSV Hartberg on 21 June 2020.

On 7 July 2021, he joined SV Horn on loan for the 2021–22 season.

References

External links
 
 OEFB Profile
 OEFB NT Profile

2000 births
Living people
Austrian footballers
Austria youth international footballers
SK Rapid Wien players
SV Horn players
Austrian Regionalliga players
Austrian Football Bundesliga players
2. Liga (Austria) players
Association football defenders